Valens Ndayisenga (born 1 January 1994) is a Rwandan former professional cyclist, who competed professionally in 2016 and 2017 for the  and  squads.

Born in Muhazi-Rwamagana, Ndayisenga was the 2014 National Road Race champion of Rwanda. He was 8th on stage 4 of the 2014 La Tropicale Amissa Bongo and represented his country at the 2014 Commonwealth Games in Glasgow in the time trial finishing in 23rd place. In 2016, he won the Tour of Rwanda for a second time.

Major results

2012
 3rd Road race, National Road Championships
 5th Time trial, African Junior Road Championships
2013
 1st Stage 2 Tour of Rwanda
 7th Time trial, African Road Championships
2014
 National Road Championships
1st  Road race
1st  Time trial
 1st  Overall Tour of Rwanda
1st Young rider classification
1st Stage 2
 5th Grand Prix d'Oran
 6th Overall Tour de Blida
 7th Circuit d'Alger
2015
 1st  Time trial, National Road Championships
 1st Prologue Tour d'Egypte
 African Road Championships
2nd  Under-23 time trial
4th Team time trial
6th Under-23 road race
7th Time trial
 African Games
3rd  Team time trial
10th Time trial
2016
 1st Overall Tour of Rwanda
1st Young rider classification
1st Stages 2 & 6
 2nd Time trial, National Road Championships
 African Road Championships
5th Team time trial
6th Time trial
2017
 National Road Championships
2nd Road race
2nd Time trial
 African Road Championships
3rd  Team time trial
5th Time trial
 6th Overall Tour of Rwanda
1st Stage 7
 10th Overall Tour du Cameroun
1st Young rider classification
2018
 2nd  Team time trial, African Road Championships
 6th Overall Tour of Rwanda
2019
 African Road Championships
2nd  Team time trial
9th Time trial

References

External links

Living people
1994 births
Rwandan male cyclists
Commonwealth Games competitors for Rwanda
Cyclists at the 2014 Commonwealth Games
Cyclists at the 2018 Commonwealth Games
People from Rwamagana District
African Games bronze medalists for Rwanda
African Games medalists in cycling
Competitors at the 2015 African Games